Frederick Hazlitt Brennan (September 23, 1901 – June 30, 1962) was an American screenwriter of more than thirty films between 1929 and 1953 and the director of the ABC/Desilu western television series, The Life and Legend of Wyatt Earp (1955-1961), starring Hugh O'Brian as deputy Marshal Wyatt Earp.

Born in St. Louis, Missouri, he was educated at the University of Missouri in Columbia  and began his career as a newspaper reporter. He wrote many short stories and was published in The Saturday Evening Post, Collier's Weekly, and other magazines. He published several novels and wrote for the theatre including the play The Wookey, which ran on Broadway.  
 
He died in Ventura County, California, from a self-inflicted gunshot wound, and was survived by his three children.

Selected filmography
 Strong Boy (1929)
 Speakeasy (1929)
 Words and Music (1929)
 God's Gift to Women (1931)
 Sporting Blood (1931)
 Play Girl (1932)
 The Big Broadcast of 1938 (1938)
 A Guy Named Joe (1943)
 Follow the Sun (1951)
 A Girl in Every Port (1952)

References

External links
 

1901 births
1962 suicides
American male journalists
American male screenwriters
Writers from Missouri
People from St. Louis County, Missouri
People from Los Angeles
Suicides by firearm in California
Journalists from California
Screenwriters from California
20th-century American male writers
20th-century American screenwriters
20th-century American journalists
1962 deaths